This is a list of the largest operational natural gas-fired power stations in the United States.

In 2019 there were around 1900 natural gas power stations in the United States, of which about 800 belonged to electric utilities. In 2019, these natural gas plants produced 38% of the United States electricity production, the highest percentage of any source above coal, nuclear and renewables. Natural gas power stations opened at a fast rate throughout the 2010s, quickly replacing aging, dirty, and economically unviable coal-fired power stations, but by the early 2020s new plants were mostly wind and solar with only Texas, Ohio and Pennsylvania continuing to open significant numbers of gas plants.

Natural gas-fired power stations

See also 

 List of Coal-fired power stations in the United States
 List of Power stations in the United States
 List of largest power stations in the United States
 Natural Gas in the United States
 Natural gas
 Energy in the United States
 Electricity sector of the United States
 List of largest power stations
 List of countries by natural gas production
List of solar power stations in the United States

References

External links

United States
Gas
Natural gas
Gas